Orange peel is the peel of an orange. Orange Peel or Orange peel may also refer to:

Science and technology
 The Goode homolosine projection, often called the "orange-peel projection"
 Orange peel (effect), a type of finish on painted or cast surfaces
 Orange peel effect, on a gramophone record
 Orange peel colour, a shade of orange
 Orange peel fungus (Aleuria aurantia) 
 Peau d'orange (French for "skin of an orange"), describing anatomy with the appearance and dimpled texture of orange peel

Other uses
 Orange Peel (event), an event held at Oklahoma State University, US
 Orange Peel (horse), a thoroughbred stallion
 Orange-peel map or Goode homolosine projection, a map projection
 Sir Robert Peel (1788–1850), British statesman nicknamed "Orange Peel"
 The Orange Peel, a concert venue in Asheville, North Carolina, US

See also
 Peel (disambiguation)
 Zest (ingredient), a food ingredient prepared by scraping or cutting from the outer skin of citrus fruits such as oranges